Gara Altyn Sport Kluby is a Turkmenistani football club based in Balkanabat. They played in the top division in Turkmenistani football in 2008. Their home stadium is Balkanabat Stadium which can hold 10,000 people. Last time played at 2011 Ýokary Liga.

References

Football clubs in Turkmenistan
2008 establishments in Turkmenistan